Spiterstulen is a former mountain farm, now a tourist station in the valley Visdalen in Lom in Oppland, Norway. Spiterstulen lies 1,100 metres above sea level, between the two highest mountains in Norway, Galdhøpiggen and Glittertind. It is the largest tourist cabin in Jotunheimen, with around 230 beds. It is reachable by car.

Spiterstulen was originally a cabin for shepherds. In 1836 it was extended for guests for the first time, since one of the paths used to cross the mountain (the Visdalen path which reaches 1490 m, slightly higher than the present route 55) passed by. In 1881 a proper tourist station was built, which has been extended several times.

References

Bibliography
 

Tourist huts in Norway
Jotunheimen
Galdhøpiggen